A laugh track is canned laughter

Laugh Track or Laugh Tracks may refer to:

Laugh Tracks, an album by Tim Cohen 2010
Laugh Tracks (Knocked Loose album), 2016

See also
Risas enlatadas (Laugh Tracks) Javier Calvo short-story compilation 2001